A cabriolet is a light horse-drawn vehicle, with two wheels and a single horse. The carriage has a folding hood that can cover its two occupants, one of whom is the driver. It has a large rigid apron, upward-curving shafts, and usually a rear platform between the C springs for a groom. The design was developed in France in the eighteenth century and quickly replaced the heavier hackney carriage as the vehicle for hire of choice in Paris and London.

The cab of taxi-cab or "hansom cab" is a shortening of cabriolet.
 
Other horse-drawn cabs include:

Araba or aroba: used in Turkey and neighboring countries
Araña: Mexican, two-wheeled
Bounder: four-wheeled
Gharry or gharri: used especially in India
Kalesa or calesa (sometimes called a karitela): used in the Philippines
Dorożka in eastern EuropeMinibus: light carriage, usually with a rear door and seats for four passengers; formerly used as a cabTwo-wheeler: two-wheeled cab or hansom

One who drives a horse-drawn cab for hire is a cabdriver''.

See also
Hansom cab
Cabriolet (automobile)
 Types of carriages

References

Carriages
Animal-powered vehicles